Jang Soo-young (born 22 September 1988) is a South Korean badminton player from the Samsung Electro-Mechanics team. She joined the Korean national team in 2003. Jang graduated from the Korea National Sport University.

Achievements

Asian Junior Championships 
Mixed doubles

BWF International Challenge/Series
Women's singles

Women's doubles

 BWF International Challenge tournament
 BWF International Series tournament

Filmography

Television shows

References

External links
 
 
 

1988 births
Living people
Badminton players from Seoul
South Korean female badminton players
Korea National Sport University alumni
21st-century South Korean women